Rumple Minze is a German-style liqueur brand, best known for peppermint schnapps. The brand is owned by the holding company Diageo, based in London.

The Rumple Minze peppermint liquor has a strong peppermint smell and taste, and it has a high alcohol content at 50% alcohol by volume, (100 proof), compared to the 40% (or 80 proof) of most liquors. It is commonly served chilled, straight up (in some cases as a digestif) or it can also be mixed to form various cocktails.

Rumple Minze was rated a 95 (out of a possible 100) by the Beverage Tasting Institute. The United States is the top market for this product. With immense popularity in the hip culture of Portland, OR, Rumple Minze has staked claim to Oregon's state spirit of choice. The success of their peppermint schnapps has led Rumple Minze to release two new flavors which include a berry-flavored liqueur and a lime-flavored liqueur, both of which are also 100 proof.

The logo on the front of the bottle is a picture of a double-headed golden eagle.

References 

Diageo brands